Predrag Živković (22 January 19366 April 2021), nicknamed Tozovac was one of the most famous Serbian folk singers and composers. He was also an accomplished accordion player and entertainer who appeared in movies and hosted several music TV shows.

He died on 6 April 2021, because of difficulties with COVID-19.

Early life
Tozovac was born in Kraljevo, Kingdom of Yugoslavia on 22 January 1936. His father Svetozar "Toza" Živković was also a musician and a restaurant owner, while mother Budimka was a housewife. His father was shot in 1941 in Kraljevo during the Axis occupation of Serbia.

He went to Kraljevo high school and in 1976 graduated at the Higher School of Economics in Belgrade.

He began working as a musician in the 1960s, first as an accordion player who accompanied other, more prominent singers, while later in the decade, he teamed up with other composers like Duško Radetić, Bane Popov, and Dušan Karaklajić, becoming a folk music star himself.

Musical career
During his 40-year-long career, Tozovac recorded over 30 singles and 20 albums, played on over 300 concerts in all of the former Yugoslavia, France, United States, Canada, United Kingdom, Austria, Germany, etc. Most prominent concerts were in Belgrade, in the Dom Sindikata Hall and in Zagreb, in the Vatroslav Lisinski Concert Hall.

In addition to songs either composed by him or his colleagues, he also recorded many Serbian folk songs. Most important hits during his career are:

{|
|- valign=top
|
Mirjana
Ide Mile Lajkovačkom prugom
Gde si da si moj golube (duet with Mira Vasiljević)
Vodeničareva ćerka
Prazna čaša na mom stolu
Oči jedne žene
Ljubavi moja tugo
Ti si me čekala
Violino ne sviraj
Malo po malo
|
Pričaj mi o njoj
Igrale se delije
Jeremija
Siromah sam, al' volim da živimUzmi sve što ti život pružaNosila je plavi šeširić na glaviVlajnaTražiću ljubav novuLeno, MagdalenoTo ludo srce moje|
|}

Television
In the 1980s, Tozovac became a co-host of the highly popular TV folk-music show Folk parada on Television Belgrade, with another major folk star, Predrag Cune Gojković, and actress and singer Zlata Petković.

In the late 1990s and early 2000s he didn't record much, but he scored few hits, like Danče, Ljubav je za sve godine and a duet with Lepa Lukić, and was again a co-host of the most popular music TV show in Serbia, Grand Show, on TV Pink. He also held a very popular three-singers concert, performing with Predrag Cune Gojković and Miroslav Ilić.

He appeared in several feature and TV movies, like I Bog stvori kafansku pevačicu (1972) and Balkan express 2'' (1989).

Personal life
Tozovac has two illegitimate sons, and stories continue to circulate that Živković loved many beauties, one of whom was Biljana Ristić.  But after countless adventures, he finally married in the Fall of 2016, at age 80, to his longtime sweetheart of over 30 years, Mima. "Mima is my true love and my choice. Our relationship is more than love. I would describe love as a short-term disease. We are only now in the most beautiful phase because we have become friends who cannot be one without the other", he said.  He and Mima lived in Belgrade.

Živković was very outspoken about author's rights and education of young musicians. He was one of the rare folk musicians who spoke out against Slobodan Milošević. He was awarded the golden Medal for Merits of the Republic of Serbia in 2019.

See also
 Predrag Gojković Cune

References

1936 births
2021 deaths
Musicians from Kraljevo
Yugoslav male singers
20th-century Serbian male singers
Serbian folk singers
Deaths from the COVID-19 pandemic in Serbia
Burials at Belgrade New Cemetery